The 35th Tennessee Infantry Regiment or Thirty-Fifth Tennessee was an infantry regiment from Tennessee that served with the Confederate States Army in the American Civil War.  The unit was disbanded as a result of General Joseph E. Johnston's surrender to General William T. Sherman on April 26, 1865 in Greensboro, North Carolina.

Organization
The 35th Tennessee was organized on September 11, 1861 at Camp Smartt near McMinnville, TN in Warren County.

Originally organized as the 1st Tennessee Mountain Rifle Regiment and then the 5th Tennessee Infantry Regiment.  In November, 1861 it was notified to become the 35th Tennessee because another regiment was organized as the 5th Tennessee some four months prior in West Tennessee.

The Regiment consisted of men from these counties in Southeast Middle Tennessee.
Warren County
Grundy County
Van Buren County
Cannon County
Sequatchie County
DeKalb County
Hamilton County
Bledsoe County

By the end of the war other units was consolidated with the unit:

48th Tennessee Infantry
57th Tennessee Infantry
The units had been decimated and it was only logical to consolidate the units.

Original Officers
Colonel - Benjamin Jefferson Hill
Lt. Colonel - John L. Spurlock
Major/Adjutant - Joseph Brown
Surgeon - Dr. William C. Barnes
Assistant Surgeon - Dr. James M. Bell
Assistant Surgeon- Dr. J.W. Wooten
Quartermaster -  Capt. O.F. Brewster
Commissary - Capt. James S. Gribble
Chaplain - Rev. David B. Ritchey
Lt.Sgt - Willem Campbell

Battles
Notable battles fought in include Shiloh and Chickamauga.

See also
List of Tennessee Confederate Civil War units

References

Units and formations of the Confederate States Army from Tennessee
Military units and formations disestablished in 1865
1865 disestablishments in Tennessee
1861 establishments in Tennessee
Military units and formations established in 1861